Bad 25 is the 25th anniversary edition reissue of American singer-songwriter Michael Jackson's seventh studio album Bad (1987). This is the second album by Jackson re-released on its 25th anniversary, the first being Thriller 25 (2008). Bad has sold 35 million copies worldwide, making it one of the best-selling albums of all time. Bad 25 was released on September 18, 2012, with co-operation with Epic, Legacy Recordings and MJJ Productions. Along with the original album, Bad 25 contains demo recordings recorded during the Bad era, with the deluxe edition also containing a live CD and DVD of Live at Wembley July 16, 1988, Jackson's performance at Wembley Stadium in the United Kingdom during his Bad world tour.

To implement a new "Live for Now" campaign, Pepsi promoted the 25th anniversary of Bad by printing one billion Pepsi cans with a photo of Jackson from the "Smooth Criminal" video. Limited edition 16 ounce (450 ml) cans were produced and distributed worldwide. On September 18, 2012, Sony Music and the Estate of Michael Jackson in partnership with BET broadcast a two-hour TV special titled Bad 25: The Short Films of Michael Jackson, which showed the short films from Bad. Bad 25 debuted at number one on the Billboard Top Pop Catalog Albums chart and in Italy. The album received globally positive reviews, with criticism however directed at the production and features on the album.

Release
Announced in May 2012 by the Michael Jackson Company LLC, various formats of Bad 25 were released simultaneously on September 18, 2012. The album, a two-disc set, includes the original album and unreleased material recorded during the Bad sessions. The material includes early demo versions of songs from the album, demos of songs not included on the final album, and remixes.

The deluxe edition of the album, which is a box set, includes both the two discs along with a CD and DVD of the performance on July 16, 1988, at Wembley Stadium in London, a booklet with photos from the making of the Bad album and behind the scenes photos from the short films for Bad, a two-sided poster and a Bad 25 sticker. A vinyl version of the original 1987 release (which does not include "Leave Me Alone") was also released. Three songs, "Streetwalker", "Fly Away" and "Todo Mi Amor Eres Tú" (the Spanish version of "I Just Can't Stop Loving You") appeared on Bad: Special Edition in 2001. The Japanese edition includes "Bad" (Live at Yokohama Stadium September 1987).

Bad 25 is the ninth album released by Sony and Motown since Michael Jackson's death on June 25, 2009.

Marketing and promotion
To implement a new "Live for Now" campaign, Pepsi planned to promote the 25th anniversary of Bad by printing one billion Pepsi cans with a photo of Michael Jackson from the "Smooth Criminal" video (which is not to be included on the CD or DVD itself). Limited edition 16 ounce (450 ml) cans were produced and distributed worldwide.

The documentary was shown at the 69th Venice International Film Festival from August 29 to September 8, 2012, and premiered (in a edited version) on ABC on November 22, 2012.

On September 18, 2012, Sony Music and the Estate of Michael Jackson in partnership with BET broadcast a two-hour TV special titled Bad 25: The Short Films of Michael Jackson, which shows the short films from Bad, which like Thriller revolutionized the industry, and also features interviews with fans, journalists and critics.

Singles
"I Just Can't Stop Loving You", the original debut single from Bad, was re-released as a CD single in the United States on June 5, 2012, as a Walmart exclusive. An unreleased demo, titled "Don't Be Messin' 'Round", is featured as the single's B-side. The song has been called a "beautiful solo piano and vocal piece" by Jackson's longtime engineer Bruce Swedien. The single, which has not been available as a digital download, has also been released on vinyl (the vinyl will include the original B-side, "Baby Be Mine" from Thriller, rather than "Don't Be Messin' 'Round"). The re-released single debuted atop Billboard's Hot Singles Sales chart, which ranks the top-selling physical singles according to Nielsen SoundScan. The new release of "I Just Can't Stop Loving You" debuted at No. 1 with 5,000 copies sold.

"Bad (Afrojack Remix) (DJ Buddha Edit)" featuring Pitbull was released on August 14, 2012. As a digital single prior to the album release, the single appeared on several countries' music charts. It debuted at Number 52 on Billboard Japan Hot 100 chart as the title "Bad 2012" on the week of September 15, 2012, and peaked at Number 6 several weeks later. It also appeared on US Billboard Dance/Electronic Digital Songs Chart with Number 45 for one week on September 1, 2012. On the week of September 29, 2012, it debuted on Hot Dance Club Songs chart at Number 42, and peaked at Number 18. It also appeared on Austrian Singles Chart at Number 45.

"I'm So Blue" impacted Italian radio on October 1, 2012, and was also released to some Polish and Chinese stations in December.

Commercial performance
The album opened in the United Kingdom at number six with sales of 11,475 copies, but for the second week, it fell to number thirty-eight with a severe buffeting of 3,365 copies sales. In Japan, 26,000 copies of this album had been sold during the first week of its release as number ten on Oricon album chart, the sales fell to 5,307 copies as number twenty-four for the second week. In the United States, as per Billboards chart ruling, the 2 CD standard version of Bad 25 is regarded as the same album as the original Bad (1987) but with added studio tracks, and therefore caused Bad to re-enter the Billboard 200 albums chart at #23, while the deluxe edition (including a full live disc) is regarded as a new album release  and debuted at #46 on the Billboard 200. The album sold a combined total of about 47,000 copies in its first week in the US, spending 3 consecutive weeks atop the Top Pop Catalog Albums chart. Spike Lee's Bad 25 documentary aired on ABC Thanksgiving (November 22) in the United States in a 60-minute edited version while the full 123 minute version was broadcast in the UK and Ireland on BBC2 on December 1. The documentary received widespread acclaim and currently holds a 90% rating on review site Rotten Tomatoes. The standalone version of Jackson's Live at Wembley July 16, 1988 DVD debuted at the top of DVD sales charts of several countries including the United States, Italy, France, Sweden, Austria and Norway. It debuted at number 2 in Ireland, the UK, Spain, Switzerland and Australia. Parts of the Wembley show were seen through the Bad 25 special.

Critical reception

The album received positive reviews. Ray Rahman from Entertainment Weekly grades the album "A", and reminds the box set is "a potent reminder of just how much Bad's pulsing pop holds up", and the previously unreleased songs are "real treasures". Mike Diver from BBC said, it is "an awesome, evergreen and essential pop masterpiece". Chaz Lipp from The Morton Report reviews the album "a terrific set". The Los Angeles Times reacted positively to the product; however, they were averse to the new remixes, especially collaboration with Nero, Pitbull and Afrojack.

Randall Roberts said "these are terrible commercial house tracks, and are an insult to MJ's memory because they do it so ungracefully". Evan Sawdey gave the release 7/10, criticizing Afrojack as "outright trash", and saying of Speed Demon: "it ends up sounding more like a Nero song with MJ's vocals than it does a genuine Michael Jackson remix". Supajam simply referred to the song as a disgrace, while Michael Cragg said "the world's worst rapper, Pitbull. He lazily croaks his way through two verses, spouting such lines as "I'm so out of this planet I speak a third language called that moon talk, in four years catch me with a billion doing that moonwalk". Just after he says billion he nearly manages to soil the trademark "hee hee", which only just masks the distant sound of Jackson spinning in his grave."

Formats
Standard edition
 Two disc set (album, bonus tracks disc)

Deluxe edition
 Four disc set (standard edition + concert CD + concert DVD + poster + sticker)

Deluxe collector's edition
 Four disc set (deluxe edition) + exclusive T-shirt design, exclusive headphones, "I Just Can't Stop Loving You" numbered vinyl single, Bad world tour souvenir package reproduction.

Three 180 gram vinyl LP set
 Three 180 gram vinyl discs containing a tri-gatefold jacket and the re-mastered original Bad album + all tracks from disc 2 of the 2CD edition.

Picture vinyl
 Picture disc LP (original album)

Wal-Mart exclusive
 Two disc set (standard edition) + exclusive T-shirt

Target exclusive
 Three disc set (standard edition + exclusive music video compilation DVD)

iTunes exclusive
 Three disc set (deluxe edition WITHOUT DVD) + "Bad" short film

HMV UK exclusive (NOT in Canada or Japan)
 Bonus CD given to any pre-order of a Bad 25 product at HMV.com only, featuring exclusive track "Bad (Remix by Afrojack featuring Pitbull - The Derry Mix)."

Japan exclusive
 Standard and Deluxe editions with bonus track "Bad (Live at Yokohama Stadium, September 1987)."

Track listing

Charts

Certifications

Release history

Notes

1 In Australia, Switzerland and the United Kingdom, Bad 25 and Bad are regarded as the same album.
2 In the United States, the standard version of Bad 25 is regarded as a re-issue of Bad, but the deluxe edition is counted as a new album.

References

2012 albums
Michael Jackson albums
Albums produced by Michael Jackson
Albums produced by Quincy Jones
Epic Records albums
Albums published posthumously
Reissue albums